Northside Health Careers High School (HCHS) is a magnet school in San Antonio's Northside Independent School District for students who are interested in pursuing a career in the health professions.  HCHS attracts students from school districts all across Bexar County and some from as far as Hondo, Texas.

History

HCHS opened in 1984 as one of the first magnet schools in south Texas under principal John Boyers, who remained principal until 2002.  The land on which the school sits was donated to Northside Independent School District by the San Antonio Medical Foundation.  HCHS is in the heart of San Antonio's Southwest Medical Center.

Admissions

HCHS is unique from other Bexar County magnet schools in that it operates as an independent campus rather than as part of a "parent" school (See Business Careers High School or Communications Arts High School).  Admission to HCHS requires the submission of an application and essay, as well as a C average.  Eligible applicants are entered into a lottery system with selected students notified by mail.  Prior to admitting the class of 2001, the admissions process did not operate as a lottery, and admitted students were selected based on the merits of their application.  Each year, over 800 students apply to fill only 250 spots.  As a public school, no tuition is charged to either in-district or out of district students.

Academics

HCHS educates about 900 students from the 9th grade (freshman) through 12th grade (senior).  The curriculum of HCHS complies with the requirements of the Texas Education Agency, but additional courses that relate to the health field are also offered.  Health-related electives include:
 Medical/Surgical Technology: students learn information and techniques related to surgery.
 Diagnostic Services I: the majority of this course involves the study of hematology, collecting and processing human blood tissue, as well as the ability to learn phlebotomy using a fake arm instead of a real person.
 Diagnostic Services II: this course involves the study of clinical chemistry as well as more in-depth studies of topics covered in Diagnostic Services I.  Students in this course are also allowed to practice phlebotomy on fellow students.
 Patient Care: a course for students interested in nursing, physical, occupational, and respiratory therapy
 Medical Administrative Procedures: introduces students to the clerical side of the health profession
 Clinical Rotation: students have the opportunity to visit nearby hospitals, observe professionals in the medical field, and in some cases, assist with minor medical procedures.
 Dental Science I: a course covering basic dentistry and dental-related subjects
 Dental Science II: covers more dentistry and dental-related subjects, as well as some radiology.
 Health Careers Prep ("Co-Op"): students who have a job in a health-related field for half a day, every day.
 Scientific Research and Design: students work with professionals on a research project for one year and report findings to a panel of scientists as well as other students.
SPD Certification: students take a course directed at certification in sterilization, processing and distribution, taking half a year in class and half a year doing hospital rotations

As of 2006, HCHS has grouped together Medical/surgical Technology, Diagnostics Services I, Patient Care, and Dental Science classes into a single class in which the students "rotate" from one to another each grading period.

Athletics

HCHS does not have a football, basketball, baseball or volleyball team.  HCHS does compete against other schools in golf, tennis, aquatics, bowling, track, and cross country, which HCHS considers "lifetime" sports. The school does compete in 6A classification competitions despite its 3A status, but being a 3A school they perform on a 6A level. The Health Careers athletic department has 1 state title that was won by the girls bowling team in 2019.

Accolades

HCHS is a nationally recognized school, having been named a National Blue Ribbon School for the 1990–1991 academic year. HCHS is also a Texas Education Agency(TEA) Exemplary campus, and has received the Gold Performance Acknowledgment (from the TEA). In addition, educators at HCHS have also been recognized at the state and national level for excellence in education.  In addition, since 1997, long time volunteer and resident statistician Dr. Joe Ward has run the Biostatistics Research Club.  Dr. Ward's commitment to the Northside Independent School District and HCHS has recently been recognized with the naming of Dr. Joe Ward Elementary School in his honor.

In 2004, Latin teacher Mr. Clyde Lehmann was named as a recipient of the $25,000 prize from the Milken Award Foundation.
In 2008, Health Careers was recognized as a "2008 Just for Kids Higher Performing Schools in Texas"
In 2009, 2010, 2011, and 2012, HCHS was listed as the top High School in San Antonio by Children at Risk.

HCHS was also listed as an Honor School by the Texas Business & Education Coalition for 2006. As well as being listed as one of the top 500 schools in the country by Newsweek.com for 3 consecutive years (2005–2007), HCHS was also listed as one of the top schools in Texas by Texas Monthly.

School spirit

The school mascot is the phoenix, which is sometimes affectionately referred to as the "flaming chicken" and the school colors are blue, white, and maroon. White is used as the graduation cap and gown color as a symbol of perfection and professionalism.

Alma mater

There are two versions of the school's alma mater, one written by the school's original choir teacher and an updated version written by the current head of the music department, Mark Marty.

References

External links
 The Official Health Careers High School Website 
 Northside ISD Homepage

High schools in San Antonio
Public high schools in Bexar County, Texas
Northside Independent School District high schools
Magnet schools in Texas
1984 establishments in Texas